The Valea Morii is a left tributary of the river Iza in Romania. It discharges into the Iza near Bârsana.

References

Rivers of Romania
Rivers of Maramureș County